Jay Reed Hinckley (April 23, 1840 – March 25, 1914) was a member of the Wisconsin State Assembly.

Biography
Hinckley was born on April 23, 1840; sources have differed on the location. He attended Whitestown Seminary. Later, his places of residences included the Wisconsin cities of River Falls, Hudson and Tomah. Hinckley's professions included schoolteacher, school principal and newspaper editor and publisher.

In 1868, Hinckley married Sarah A. Chamberlain. They had three children.

Political career
Hinckley was a member of the Assembly in 1883, representing the 2nd District of Monroe County, Wisconsin. Previously, he had been the school superintendent of St. Croix County, Wisconsin in 1872 and 1878. He was a Democrat.

References

External links

People from Whitestown, New York
People from River Falls, Wisconsin
People from Hudson, Wisconsin
People from Tomah, Wisconsin
Democratic Party members of the Wisconsin State Assembly
School superintendents in Wisconsin
19th-century American newspaper publishers (people)
American school principals
Schoolteachers from Wisconsin
Editors of Wisconsin newspapers
1840 births
1914 deaths
Educators from New York (state)